Gerald Renaldi (some sources Reynolds) was Archdeacon of Armagh from 1556 to 1559.

Notes

16th-century Irish Roman Catholic priests
Archdeacons of Armagh